Dillard-Gamble Houses are two historic homes located at Durham, Durham County, North Carolina.  One house is in the Colonial Revival style and the other is in the International Style.

It was listed on the National Register of Historic Places in 1979.

References

Houses on the National Register of Historic Places in North Carolina
Colonial Revival architecture in North Carolina
International style architecture in North Carolina
Houses completed in 1917
Houses in Durham, North Carolina
National Register of Historic Places in Durham County, North Carolina
1917 establishments in North Carolina